Kelley Drye & Warren LLP is an international law firm founded in 1836 and is one of the oldest firms in the United States. It operates in New York; Washington; Los Angeles; Chicago; Stamford, Connecticut; Parsippany, New Jersey; Houston, Texas; and San Diego, California. It also offers legal services through an affiliate relationship with Mumbai-based Fortitude Law Associates.

Practice areas
Kelley Drye has substantial practice areas in areas including advertising law, antitrust, bankruptcy, communications, corporate, environmental, ERISA, government contracts, government relations, labor and employment, litigation, intellectual property, international trade and customs, real estate, trust & estate and tax.

History 
In 1836, New York attorneys Hiram Barney and William Mulligan founded a law office in downtown Manhattan. They took on significant matters from the inception of the firm, including the bankruptcies of the Metropolitan Street Railway and the New York City Railway. Barney was later appointed to the prestigious position of Collector of the Customs of the Port of New York by President Abraham Lincoln.

Name partner Nicholas Kelley joined the firm at the turn of the 20th century. Kelley was instrumental in negotiations to finance the production of Chrysler automobiles. The firm also represented Westinghouse Electric in a major bankruptcy matter; Westinghouse would go on to merge with CBS some 90 years later. Name partner John Wilson Drye also brought important clients to the firm, including Union Carbide Corporation, one of the world’s oldest chemical companies.

Kelley Drye partners have long had political and legislative influence beyond the world of private law firms. Its partners have advised or have been appointed to offices by a number of American Presidents, including Andrew Jackson, Martin Van Buren, Abraham Lincoln, and Woodrow Wilson. Kelley Drye assisted in drafting the 1947 Taft Hartley Act, a foundational labor law regulating the activities and power of labor unions.

Kelley Drye merged with Washington, D.C.–based firm Collier Shannon Scott, PLLC in 2006. In April 2011, Kelley Drye merged with the Los Angeles firm White O'Connor Fink & Brenner LLP. The firm expanded its presence to Texas through a merger with Jackson Gilmour & Dobbs, P.C. in 2016.

Notable lawyers and alumni
 Jodie Bernstein, former director, Federal Trade Commission Bureau of Consumer Protection, former general counsel of the Environmental Protection Agency, and former general counsel of the Department of Health and Human Services.
 Jim Gilmore, 68th Governor of Virginia and former chairman of the Republican National Committee.
 John M. Herrmann II, former member of the United States National Security Council.
 Roberta Karmel (born 1937), Centennial Professor of Law at Brooklyn Law School and first female  Commissioner of the U.S. Securities and Exchange Commission.
 William MacLeod, former director, Federal Trade Commission Bureau of Consumer Protection.
 Charles L. (Lindy) Marinaccio, former Commissioner of the U.S. Securities and Exchange Commission.
 Doris Matsui, U.S. Representative for California's 6th congressional district.
 George Smathers, former member of the U.S. House of Representatives from Florida's 4th district and former United States Senator from Florida.
 Lee Terry, former member of the U.S. House of Representatives for Nebraska's 2nd congressional district.

References

External links 
Official site

Law firms based in New York City
1836 establishments in New York (state)